During the 2003–04 English football season, Derby County F.C. competed in the First Division.

Season summary
George Burley's first full season in charge brought little joy as Derby recorded a 20th-placed finish in the 2003–04 season, just 1 point clear of relegation with safety not confirmed until the penultimate game of the season with a 2–0 win over Millwall. With no money for players and the need to slash the club's wage bill, big names such as Fabrizio Ravanelli, Georgi Kinkladze and Craig Burley left the club with the gaps of their departure shored up by free signings; Candido Costa was taken on a season long loan whilst seven others – including Mathias Svensson and Leon Osman – were recruited on short term loans, as Derby used a club record 36 different players in the course of the season. There was also the continued introduction of academy players to the side, with Tom Huddlestone and Marcus Tudgay making significant contributions alongside players such as Lee Grant and Lee Holmes. Burley achieved safety against a background of boardroom uncertainty – Chairman Lionel Pickering, after putting temporary faith in former Coventry City chairman Bryan Richardson and a notional £30m bond, was removed from the chair after the club temporarily entered receivership by The Co-operative Bank, who instantly installed a new board composed of John Sleightholme, Jeremy Keith and Steve Harding, for the cost of £1 each.

Final league table

Results
Derby County's score comes first

Legend

Football League First Division

FA Cup

League Cup

Squad
Squad at end of season

Left club during season

References

Notes

Derby County F.C. seasons
Derby County